Nicolás Maximiliano Altamirano Acuña (born 1 April 1990) is a Chilean retired footballer who played as an attacking midfielder. His nickname is Niko.

Honours
 Ñublense
 Primera B: 2012

References

External links
 

1990 births
Living people
Chilean footballers
People from Temuco
Association football midfielders
Deportes Temuco footballers
Unión Española footballers
Deportes Copiapó footballers
Ñublense footballers
Unión Temuco footballers
Magallanes footballers
Malleco Unido footballers
Chilean Primera División players
Primera B de Chile players
Segunda División Profesional de Chile players